Dubravka Ostojić (born 19 June 1961) is a Croatian actress.

Filmography
"Zakon!" as Đurđa (2009)
"Naša mala klinika" as Sanja Grospić (2004-2007)
"Žutokljunac" as Terezija (2005)
"Osvajanja Ljudevita Posavca" as ? (2004)
"Naša kućica, naša slobodica" as ? (1999)
"Obiteljska stvar" as Maja Cvitan (1998)
"Smogovci" as Bongo's teacher (1991, 1997)
"Brisani prostor" as Sale's wife (1985)

Personal
Ostojić  was born, lives and works in Zagreb. She is married to Croatian author Ivan Vidić. 
Ostojić was previously in a relationship with Croatian actor Ivo Gregurević, with whom she had a son Marko, born in 1978.

References

1961 births
Living people
Croatian actresses
Golden Arena winners
Croatian Theatre Award winners